Sekou Camara (born 20 July 1997) is a Guinean professional footballer who plays as a forward for Liga I club FC Botoșani. In his career, Camara played mainly for Albanian clubs such as Luzi i Vogël, Besëlidhja Lezhë, Flamurtari or Teuta Durrës, but also for Finnish club HJK Helsinki.

References

External links
 

1997 births
Living people
Sportspeople from Conakry
Guinean footballers
Association football forwards
Kategoria e Parë players
KF Luz i Vogël 2008 players
Besëlidhja Lezhë players
Kategoria Superiore players
Flamurtari Vlorë players
KF Teuta Durrës players
Veikkausliiga players
Helsingin Jalkapalloklubi players
Kakkonen players
Klubi 04 players
Liga I players
FC Botoșani players
Guinean expatriate footballers
Guinean expatriate sportspeople in Albania
Expatriate footballers in Albania
Guinean expatriate sportspeople in Finland
Expatriate footballers in Finland
Guinean expatriate sportspeople in Romania
Expatriate footballers in Romania